Ribeira Brava is the name of a parish in the west-central part of Madeira, Portugal. It is part of the municipality of Ribeira Brava. It is located on the south coast of the island, 14 km west of Funchal. The population in 2011 was 6,588, in an area of 18.48 km2.

References

Freguesias of Ribeira Brava, Madeira